Al-Nahda Club (also known locally as Al-Aneed, or "The Tenacious", or just plainly as Al-Nahda) is an Omani sports club based in Al-Buraimi, Oman. The club is currently playing in the Oman Professional League, top division of Oman Football Association. Their home ground is Al-Buraimi Sports Complex. The stadium is government owned, but they also own their own personal stadium and sports equipment, as well as their own training facilities.

History
The club was founded in 2003. Achievements including qualifying for the 2008 AFC Cup and reaching the semifinals. The club name literally translates from "The Renaissance" in the Arabic language.

In 2010, Al-Nahda appointed former Poland international manager, Janusz Wójcik as their manager.

Being a multisport club
Although being mainly known for their football, Al-Nahda Club like many other clubs in Oman, have not only football in their list, but also hockey, volleyball, handball, basketball, badminton and squash. They also have a youth football team competing in the Omani Youth league.

Colors, kit providers and sponsors
Al-Nahda wears a full green (for home) and white (for away) kit. They have had many sponsors over the years, now Kelme provides them with kits.

Achievements
Al-Nahda Club players won the 2013–14 Oman Professional League

Oman Professional League (3):
Winners 2006–07, 2008–09, 2013–14.
Runners-up 2005–06.

Sultan Qaboos Cup (0):
Runners-up 2008, 2012, 2013.

Oman Professional League Cup (1): 
Winners 2016-17.
Runners-up 2017-18.

Oman Super Cup (2):
Winners 2009, 2014.

Club performance in international competitions

AFC competitions
AFC Champions League : 1 appearance
2015 : Preliminary round 2

AFC Cup : 2 appearances
2008 : Semi-Finals
2010 : Group Stage

UAFA competitions
Arab Champions League : 1 appearance
2006–07 : Round of 32
GCC Champions League: 3 appearances
2008 : Group Stage
2012 : Group Stage
2014 : Semi-Finals

Players
Al-Nahda Club – 2014–15 Oman Professional League

First team squad

Personnel

Technical staff

Management

Presidents

References

External links
Al-Nahda Club – SOCCERWAY
Al-Nahda Club – GOALZZ.com

Football clubs in Oman
Oman Professional League
Al Buraimi Governorate
Association football clubs established in 2003
2003 establishments in Oman